In My Hands is an album by Natalie MacMaster. It was released in 1999 on Rounder Records. The album won the 2000 Juno Award for Instrumental Album of the Year.

Critical reception
The Washington Post wrote that "Alison Krauss' satiny soprano perfectly matches MacMaster's fiddle on 'Get Me Through December'."

Track listing
 "In My Hands" - 4:23
 "Welcome to the Trossachs" - 7:17
 "Gramma" - 2:35
 "Blue Bonnets Over the Border" - 4:24
 "New York Jig" - 4:06
 "Flamenco Fling" - 3:44
 "Space Ceilidh" - 3:41
 "Olympic Reel" - 3:19
 "Father MacLeod's Jig" - 2:55
 "Get Me Through December" - 6:29
 "The Farewell" - 5:25
 "Moxham Castle" - 4:17
 "Mom's Jig" - 5:15
 "Flora MacDonald" - 3:48

Personnel
 Scott Alexander - bass
 Art Avalos - percussion, handclaps
 Margaret Ann (Cameron) Beaton - spoken introduction
 Marie Berard - violin
 James Blennerhasset - bass
 Kevin Breit - electric guitar
 Joel Chiasson - piano
 Charlie Cooley - drums
 Jesse Cook - guitar
 Al Cross - drums
 Aaron Davis - piano
 David Direnzo - percussion
 Bruce Dixon - bass
 Phil Dwyer - trombone, saxophone
 Ray Fean - drum
 Fujiko Imajishi - violin
 John Barlow Jarvis - piano
 Denis Keldie - organ
 Laoise Kelly - harp
 Alison Krauss - vocals on track 10
 Viktor Krauss - bass
 Howie MacDonald - piano
 David MacIsaac - guitar 
 Brent Mason - guitar
 Mark O'Connor - fiddle 
 Douglas Perry - viola
 Terry Promane - trumpet
 Matt Rollins - piano
 Gordie Sampson - keyboards, guitar, bass guitar, percussion
 Chase Sanborn - trumpet
 Mary Shannon - mandolin
 Sharon Shannon - accordion
 Harry Stinson - drums
 Rick Tate - trumpet
 Paul Widner - cello
 Glenn Worf - bass
 Natalie MacMaster - vocals, acoustic and electric fiddle

References

Natalie MacMaster albums
1999 albums
Juno Award for Instrumental Album of the Year albums